Jerzy Braun can refer to:
 Jerzy Braun (rower) (1911–1968), Polish rower
 Jerzy Braun (writer) (1901–1975), Polish writer, activist and politician